is a yaoi novel and manga created by Hitoyo Shinozaki and illustrated by Tōru Kousaka. Besides the manga, there are also drama CDs and four OVA's.

Synopsis
Eighteen year old, Yukiya Ayase is a college student. His cousin Tetsuo Ishii betrays and sells him in an auction to the highest bidder to settle his heavy debts. Ayase is bought by loan shark Somuku Kanou for 120 million yen.

The reason Kanou does this is because he remembers Ayase from 4 years ago, when Ayase, a stranger-(who was fourteen years old at the time), had helped him. Now Kanou wants to keep Ayase in order to get close to him, but when Ayase tries to back out, Kanou then uses the debt of 120 million yen to force Ayase to stay with him, reminding him that Ayase now belongs to him. As Ayase is still a student and does not have a job, he is forced to sell his body to Kanou for 500,000 yen every time that they have sex.

Characters

 
An eighteen-year-old young half-Japanese boy who was betrayed by his own cousin, Tetsuo, and was auctioned off to settle Tetsuo's debt. He was bought by Kanou for 120 million yen, and has to pay off the debt by having sex with Kanou for 500,000 yen each time. He lost his parents at a young age and had a lonely childhood. Gentle and very naive, he has a hard time expressing himself to others and is not very good at socializing. However, he is able to stand up for what he believes in. He tends to keep to himself and to act aloof towards people but Kanou has forced him into a life of sexual servitude. He also has a knack for getting in trouble mostly because he does not realize that men tend to feel a very strong sexual attraction to him when he's around. Currently, Kanou, Kuba Homare, and Takanohashi Yamato, a young family friend of Kanou, have confessed their feelings to him.

He is confused about his true feelings for Kanou and often feels guilty that he is involved with another man. In the manga, he is currently trying to change his personality to be a bit more outgoing and more sociable. Having obtained Kanou's permission, he is currently working part-time as a kitchen helper in Someya's bar. In the released art-book, an interview with him shows that his motto is "You can go far little by little" and that he washes his left arm first when bathing.

Known in Shinjuku as 'a man no one in Shinjuku can disobey', he is a 26-year-old businessman who runs a financial firm. He was saved by Ayase's kindness around four years ago, and therefore he bought Ayase from an auction by buying him for 120 million yen. In order to keep Ayase to himself, he forced the debt of 120 million yen (plus a hefty interest of 10% interest every 10 days) on Ayase as a means to keep Ayase with him, and pays Ayase 500,000 yen each time they have sex. He has a hard time conveying his feelings towards Ayase due to his gruff, no-nonsense exterior, and particularly Ayase's naïveté and reluctance to accept a relationship between two men. Domineering, possessive and jealous, Kanou forbids anyone to come close to Ayase without his permission and lets him go outside only begrudgingly. He is not above bullying or even manhandling Ayase to get his point across. Nevertheless, Kanou is usually kind, considerate, and even loving towards Ayase and expresses his passionate affection without restraint.

Realizing that he has started off on the wrong foot by raping Ayase after the auction, he tries to make it up to him by doing various things with mixed results. For example, he solves Tetsuo's debt, and, in the manga, he buys Ayase new clothes, allows him to attend summer classes, and allows Ayase to work. In the released art-book, an interview with him shows that his motto is "perseverance brings success" and that he washes his right shoulder first when bathing.

Ayase's cousin, who auctioned him off to try to repay his debts. Since he only thinks of himself, he can't calmly analyze his surroundings.

 and 
 Homare 

 Misao 
The 25-year-old twins who work for Kanou. Homare is the elder and displays more feeling and emotions compared to his younger brother. Homare has shown to be wildly attracted to Ayase. He realized this after he rescued Ayase from a sexual attack initiated by Ayase's friend and fellow university student, Iida. However, the elder Kuba twin keeps from voicing his true feelings out of loyalty to his boss and fear of his retaliation should he take action. Nevertheless, Homare may openly take Ayase's defense and encourages him to be more assertive in front of Kanou. In the extra "I Can't Quit" Homare has finally confessed his feelings towards Ayase, but Ayase's response is ambiguous. Misao doesn't pay any attention whatsoever to the protagonists' relationship, or to anybody else for that matter, even his own brother. A possible explanation for this lack of feeling and emotion can be found in one side story, where it is revealed that Misao can only see the same dull expression on everyone face. There is currently no way to differentiate Homare from Misao physically. However, in the manga, it appears that Homare's suit is darker than Misao's. According to the released art-book, Homare tends to like anything to do with cars and Misao loves food. The book also mentions Homare owning a 32 Skyline GT-R which costs approximately 5.9 million Yen.

The 24-year-old okama (Transgender Female) who is Kanou's childhood friend. She owns an Okama bar and is currently employing Ayase as a part-time kitchen helper in the manga. She apparently loves her father very much even though her father objects to her being an okama and opening a bar. She loves beautiful things and tries to improve the relationship between Kanou and Ayase by giving the former 'tips'. For example, she gave Kanou a book titled "How to take care of small animals" - because Ayase tends to resemble a small animal according to Kanou when he was trying to get Ayase to open up to him. Whether it was meant to be a joke or not is unknown. Eventually, she becomes the couple's counselor of sorts. She always speaks abrasively to Kanou and often intercedes with him in favor of Ayase. SHe refers to Kanou as 'Danna' (Japanese for 'Master') which is an informal way to refer to one's husband. In the art-book, it is said that the most expensive item she owns is a long-sleeved kimono which cost 3.3 million Yen.

The 22-year-old student who apparently works as a part-time cameraman. Although he addresses Kanou as 'nī-san' (Japanese for 'older brother'), he is not related to Kanou. He loves to record AV (Adult Videos) and thought Ayase was a girl the first time they meet when Kanou calls him. Despite often getting beaten up by Kanou, he displays an incessantly friendly behavior towards him and is not afraid to taunt and tease him from time to time. He also has developed a liking for Ayase and is especially grateful to him for having mellowed Kanou's merciless and aggressive personality. In the art-book, the most expensive thing he owns is his camera which costs approximately 400,000 yen. He also dreams of recording an AV of Kanou and Ayase.

Naotoshi Hayashida
A competitor of Kanou, and the owner of Akushi. He often tries to make Kanou suffer, but ends up being pressed down instead. However, it also proves that he is tough and hates giving up.

Someya Kaoruko's father is a childhood friend of Kanou's father. He thinks of Kanou as his own son. He has forgiven his third son for being an okama, and tends to lecture him a bit when they meet. He's one of the few people who can speak to Kanou unsparingly. His career is successful, but his private life seems to be the opposite.

A man who dreams towards Ayase's thin chest. He is forty-one years old, but appears very young. He decorated Kanou's apartment and selects his and Ayase's clothing.

Takaaki Tokigawa
Ayase's formal University friend. He has been secretly taking photos of Ayase since high school, and at one point kidnaps and tries to imprison him in his home, but is foiled by Kanou and the twins.

Rikako Ishii
Ishii Tetsuo's mother and Ayase's aunt.

Media
Opening Theme: "Romance Way" by Issei

Ending Song:  by Tetsuya Kakihara & Wataru Hatano

Notes

External links
 Official site for the OVA 
 
 Mania review of volume 1 of the manga
 Mania review of volume 2 of the manga

1999 Japanese novels
2007 anime OVAs
Light novels
Yaoi anime and manga